The Lee School (also known as the Lee Adult Education Center) is an historic school in Leesburg, Florida, United States. It is located at 207 North Lee Street. On February 17, 1995, it was added to the U.S. National Register of Historic Places. As of 2008, the Lee School is up for sale, posted by the Lake County School District.

References

External links
 Lake County listings at National Register of Historic Places
 Florida's Office of Cultural and Historical Programs
 Lake County listings
 Lee Educational Center

National Register of Historic Places in Lake County, Florida
Leesburg, Florida